Sportpark Nieuw Hanenburg is a cricket ground in The Hague, the Netherlands.  The first recorded match on the ground was in 1966 when the Netherlands played Oxford University. Over the next three decades it hosted a number of touring teams, as well as the 1998 European Cricket Championships.  The Netherlands Women later played a Women's One Day International there in 2003 against Ireland Women in the IWCC Trophy.

The ground is used by Quick Haag Cricket Club.

References

External links
Sportpark Nieuw Hanenburg at ESPNcricinfo
Sportpark Nieuw Hanenburg at CricketArchive

Cricket grounds in the Netherlands
Sports venues in The Hague